James George Moxey (born May 28, 1953) is a Canadian retired professional ice hockey forward. Born in Toronto, Ontario, Moxey played 127 games in the National Hockey League for the Cleveland Barons, Los Angeles Kings, and California Golden Seals between 1974 and 1977. As a youth, he played in the 1965 Quebec International Pee-Wee Hockey Tournament with the Toronto George Bell minor ice hockey team. Moxey now has 2 children, Jennifer and Kevin, and 3 grandchildren

Career statistics

Regular season and playoffs

References

External links

1953 births
Living people
California Golden Seals draft picks
California Golden Seals players
Canadian ice hockey forwards
Cleveland Barons (NHL) players
Edmonton Oilers (WHA) draft picks
Fort Worth Texans players
Hamilton Red Wings (OHA) players
Los Angeles Kings players
Salt Lake Golden Eagles (CHL) players
Salt Lake Golden Eagles (WHL) players
Ice hockey people from Toronto
Springfield Indians players